Sami Awad Aldeeb Abu-Sahlieh (in Arabic:  سامي عوض الذيب أبو ساحلية / Sāmy ʿwḍ ʾĀd-dyb ʾĀbw-Sāḥlyh) (born 5 September 1949 in Zababdeh, near Jenin in the West Bank) is a Swiss Palestinian lawyer.

Aldeeb was the head of the Arab and Islamic Law department at the Swiss Institute of Comparative Law from 1980 to 2009. He now directs the Center of Arab and Islamic law and teaches at various universities in Switzerland, France and Italy.

He is the author of many books and articles on Arab and Islamic law. In 2008 he published a bilingual edition of the Quran (Arabic - French) classifying the chapters (surahs) in chronological order according to Al-Azhar, with reference to variations, abrogations and Jewish and Christian writings. He is currently preparing a similar edition in Italian and English. He also translated the Swiss constitution into Arabic for the Swiss Confederation.

Biography 
Born to a family of Christian peasants in Zababdeh, near Jenin, he attended primary school in his village (1956–61) before joining the Minor Seminary of the Latin Patriarchate of Jerusalem in Beit-Jala, near Bethlehem (1961–65). Four years later he left to attend a course in tailoring at the Salesian Technical School of Bethlehem (1965–1968), and worked in the tailoring trade in Jenin while, at the same time, working for the International Committee of the Red Cross. In 1970 he immatriculated at Jenin as a self-taught student, and thereafter obtained a scholarship from the l'Œuvre Saint-Justin in Fribourg, to study in Switzerland.

In April 1974, he  received his law degree from the University of Fribourg  cum laude, and then went on to study for a doctorate of Laws at the University of Fribourg and enrolled in the Graduate Institute of International Studies at Geneva to simultaneously study for an Honours degree in Political Science. He was awarded a degree  with Honours from the Graduate Institute at Geneva in January 1976, His dissertation was entitled: "The Right of peoples to sovereignty, analytic study of the Marxist-Leninist theory and the soviet position".

Researching for his doctoral thesis, he spent a year in Egypt. He defended his thesis: "The impact of religion on the legal order, case of Egypt, non-Muslims in an Islamic country" in December 1978 at the Faculty of Law in Fribourg, receiving the distinction summa cum laude. His graduation took place after the publication of his thesis on 14 November 1979. During his studies he received a grant from l'Œuvre Saint-Justin in Fribourg (1970–1977) and a grant from the Swiss Confederation (1977–1979). During his stay in Egypt (1976–77), he interviewed forty Egyptian personalities.

He was a federal civil servant at the Swiss Institute of Comparative Law in Lausanne from 1 November 1980 to 31 December 2009, heading the Department of Arab and Islamic law. As part of his duties, he wrote hundreds of legal opinions for Swiss and foreign authorities, for courts, lawyers, enterprises as well as for private individuals in the fields of family law, inheritance, criminal law and commercial law. In the course of his travels in Arab countries, he built up the most comprehensive collection of works on Arab and Muslim Law in Western Europe for the Swiss Institute of Comparative Law.   During his work for the Swiss Confederation, he traveled to the following countries, in order to purchase books and to maintain contacts with law schools and research centers: Morocco (4 times), Algeria (twice), Tunisia (5 times), Libya (3 times), Egypt (9 times), Sudan (once), Jordan (4 times), Lebanon (twice), Syria (3 times), Iraq (once), Iran (once), Bahrain (twice), Kuwait (twice), United Arab Emirates (twice), Oman (twice), Palestine / Israel (7 times), South Yemen (once), North Yemen (twice), Qatar (once), Saudi Arabia (twice). 

In May 2009, he opened his own Center of Arab and Islamic law, offering the following services: legal consultations, conferences, translations, research and courses concerning Arab and Islamic Law, and the relation between Muslims and the West, assistance for students and researchers. 
On 29 June 2009 he received his Habilitation to supervise research (HDR) from the University of Bordeaux. In February 2010, he qualified as a University Professor, granted by the CNU, in sections 1 (private law) and 15 (Arabic). 
He was naturalized as a Swiss citizen on 11 May 1984.

Teaching and conferences 
Aldeeb taught Arab and Islamic Law in various universities; Institute of Canon Law of Strasbourg (1985–1991), Faculty of Law and Political Science of Aix-en-Provence (since 2005), Faculty of Law of Palermo (since 2007), CERISDI of Palermo (since 2007), International Faculty of Comparative Law in Strasbourg (since 2007), Faculty of Law of Trento (since 2010), Faculty of Law of Cergy-Pontoise (since 2010), Faculty of Law of Grenoble (since 2010), Faculty of Theology of Lugano (since 2011). He has also given hundreds of lectures in various countries.

Positions 
He expressed various positions critical of Islam, for example, he positioned himself for a ban on the erection of minarets in Switzerland, since in his opinion the constitution allows prayer, but not shouting. He wants the worldly struggle for human rights, is against male and female circumcision, ritual slaughter, religious cemeteries, the death penalty and, in principle, the use of force. He holds the theory that the Quran was written by a rabbi.

Awards 
15 November 1981: Vigener Prize of the Faculty of Law of Fribourg for his doctoral thesis.
21 November 2009: Elected Academician of "Studium - Accademia di Casale Monferrato e per l'Arte del, the Letteratura the Storia, the e Scienze the Umanità Varies."

Publications 
Sami Aldeeb’s publications consist of about thirty books and more than 200 articles on Arab and Islamic Law, in various languages:

La Fatiha et la culture de la haine: Interprétation du 7e verset à travers les siècles, Createspace (Amazon), Charleston, 2014
Zakat, corruption et jihad : Interprétation du verset coranique 9:60 à travers les siècles, Createspace (Amazon), Charleston, 2015
Alliance, désaveu et dissimulation : Interprétation des versets coraniques 3:28-29 à travers les siècles, Createspace (Amazon), Charleston, 2015
Nulle contrainte dans la religion: Interprétation du verset coranique 2:256 à travers les siècles, Createspace (Amazon), Charleston, 2015
Le jihad dans l’islam: Interprétation des versets coraniques relatifs au jihad à travers les siècles, Createspace (Amazon), Charleston, 2016
Le droit des peuples à disposer d’eux-mêmes, étude analytique de la doctrine marxiste-léniniste et de la position soviétique, polycopié, IUHEI, 1976
Discriminations contre les non-juifs tant chrétiens que musulmans en Israël, Pax Christi, Lausanne, Pâques 1992
Le droit musulman de la famille et des successions à l’épreuve des ordres juridiques occidentaux, Sami Aldeeb et Andrea Bonomi (éd.), Publications de l’Institut suisse de droit comparé, Schulthess, Zürich, 1999
Les sanctions en droit musulman: passé, présent et avenir, Cahiers de l’Orient chrétien 6, CEDRAC (USJ), Beyrouth, 2007
Demain les islamistes au pouvoir? Conception musulmane de la loi et son impact en Occident, Association culturelle du Razès, Montréal d’Aude (France), 2009
Discriminations contre les non-juifs tant chrétiens que musulmans en Israël, Pax Christi, Lausanne, Pâques 1992
Non-musulmans en pays d’Islam: cas de l’Egypte, Createspace (Amazon), Charleston, 2e édition, 2012
Les musulmans face aux droits de l’homme: religion & droit & politique, étude et documents, Verlag Dr. Dieter Winkler, P.O.Box 102665, D-44726 Bochum, 1994
Les mouvements islamistes et les droits de l’homme, in Herausforderungen Historisch-politische Analysen, Winkler, Bochum, 1998: Winkler
Avenir des musulmans en Occident: cas de la Suisse, Createspace (Amazon), Charleston, 2e édition, 2012 
Cimetière musulman en Occident: Normes juives, chrétiennes et musulmanes, Createspace (Amazon), Charleston, 2e édition, 2012
Circoncision masculine et féminine: Débat religieux, médical, social et juridique, Createspace (Amazon), Charleston, 2e édition, 2012
Circoncision: Le complot du silence, Createspace (Amazon), Charleston, 2e édition, 2012
Droit musulman et modernité: diagnostiques et remèdes, Createspace (Amazon), Charleston, 2014
Introduction au droit arabe: droit de la famille et des successions, droit pénal, droit médical, droit socio-économique, Createspace (Amazon), Charleston, 2e édition, 2012
Introduction au droit musulman: Fondements, sources et principes, Createspace (Amazon), Charleston, 2e édition, 2012
L’Islam et la destruction des statues: Étude comparée sur l’art figuratif en droit juif, chrétien et musulman, Createspace (Amazon), Charleston, 2015
Le changement de religion en Egypte, Createspace (Amazon), Charleston, 2013
Le contrat d’entreprise en droit arabe: cas de l’Égypte: avec les dispositions des principaux codes arabes en différentes langues, Createspace (Amazon), Charleston, 2e édition, 2012
Les musulmans en Occident entre droits et devoirs, Createspace (Amazon), Charleston, 2e édition, 2012
Les successions en droit musulman: cas de l’Egypte: présentation, versets coraniques et dispositions légales, Createspace (Amazon), Charleston, 2e édition, 2012
Manuel de droit musulman et arabe, Createspace (Amazon), Charleston, 2e édition, 2012
Mariages mixtes avec des musulmans: Cas de la Suisse avec modèle de contrat en six langues, Createspace (Amazon), Charleston, 2e édition, 2012
Projets de constitutions islamiques et déclarations des droits de l’homme dans le monde arabo-musulman, Createspace (Amazon), Charleston, 2e édition, 2012

External links 
 
 Official site
 Blog

References 

1949 births
Genital integrity activists
Palestinian academics
Living people
People from Zababdeh
Swiss health activists
Former Christians
Critics of Islam
Critics of Judaism
Graduate Institute of International and Development Studies alumni
University of Fribourg alumni
Anti-Islam sentiment in Switzerland
Palestinian emigrants to Switzerland